Patricia Schnauer (born 30 July 1942) is a former New Zealand politician. She was an MP from 1996 to 1999, representing the ACT New Zealand party.

Early years
Before entering politics, she was a lawyer specialising in matrimonial property and family law, and after leaving Parliament, she rejoined  her family law practice, Schnauer and Co.

Member of Parliament

She was first elected to Parliament in the 1996 election, becoming a list MP and serving as her party's spokesperson on justice. At the 1999 election, however, she chose to leave politics, and did not stand for re-election.

Further reading
 
 

1942 births
ACT New Zealand MPs
Living people
New Zealand women lawyers
New Zealand libertarians
Women members of the New Zealand House of Representatives
Members of the New Zealand House of Representatives
New Zealand list MPs
20th-century New Zealand lawyers